Lujan v. Defenders of Wildlife, 504 U.S. 555 (1992), was a landmark Supreme Court of the United States decision, handed down on June 12, 1992, that heightened standing requirements under Article III of the United States Constitution. It is "one of the most influential cases in modern environmental standing jurisprudence." Lily Henning of the Legal Times stated that:
In [this] decision, hailed by the right and attacked by the left as well as by a broad swath of legal scholars, the Court made clear that plaintiffs must suffer a concrete, discernible injury—not a "conjectural or hypothetical one"—to be able to bring suit in federal court. It, in effect, made it more difficult for plaintiffs to challenge the actions of a government agency when the actions don't directly affect them.
In Lujan, the Court held that a group of American wildlife conservation and other environmental organizations lacked standing to challenge regulations jointly issued by the U.S. Secretaries of the Interior  and Commerce, regarding the geographic area to which a particular section of the Endangered Species Act of 1973 applied. The case arose over issues of US funding of development projects in Aswan, Egypt and Mahaweli, Sri Lanka that could harm endangered species in the affected areas. The government declared that the act did not apply to projects outside of the United States and Defenders of Wildlife sued.

Opinion 
In Scalia's interpretation of Article III of the Constitution, plaintiffs must demonstrate that they have suffered an injury in fact, caused by the defendant, which a favorable court decision could redress, to meet the standing requirement to bring a case before the court. In his opinion for the majority, Justice Scalia stated that Defenders had failed to satisfy the “injury in fact” element. He wrote that the Court rejected the view that the citizen suit provision of the statute conferred upon “all persons an abstract, self-contained, non-instrumental ‘right’ to have the Executive observe the procedures required by law." Rather, he explained, an American citizen plaintiff must have suffered a tangible and particular harm. 

Additionally, in the portion of his opinion that garnered only plurality support, Justice Scalia determined that the plaintiffs failed to demonstrate the redressability element.

In his opinion concurring in part  Justice Anthony Kennedy, joined by Justice David Souter, asserted that an airline ticket to the affected geographic areas with endangered species in question would have been enough to satisfy the imminent threat of future injury requirement.

Justice John Paul Stevens concurred in the judgement as well, but disagreed with the Court's finding that Defenders lacked standing. Justice Stevens instead rested his opinion on a statutory construction of the Endangered Species Act.

See also
 List of United States Supreme Court cases, volume 504
 List of United States Supreme Court cases
 Lists of United States Supreme Court cases by volume
 List of United States Supreme Court cases by the Rehnquist Court

References

External links

Case Brief for Lujan v. Defenders of Wildlife at Lawnix.com

1992 in the environment
1992 in United States case law
United States Constitution Article Three case law
United States standing case law
United States environmental case law
United States Supreme Court cases
United States Supreme Court cases of the Rehnquist Court
Egypt–United States relations
Sri Lanka–United States relations